Lawrance Road was the site of a railway station on the North Coast railway in northern New South Wales, Australia. The station was provided between 1905 and 1970 and served a pastoral area.

References

Disused regional railway stations in New South Wales
Northern Rivers
Railway stations in Australia opened in 1905
Railway stations closed in 1970